Valee is an american rapper.

Valee or Valée may also refer to:

 Sylvain Charles Valée, Marshal of France
 Valée system, artillery system developed by Sylvain Charles Valée

See also
 Vale (disambiguation)
 Valle (disambiguation)
 Vallé (disambiguation)
 Vallée (disambiguation)